Get Millie Black is an upcoming television series created by writer Marlon James in his first television series.

Premise 
Jamaican-born detective Millie-Jean Black is forced out of Scotland Yard, and she returns home to join the Jamaican Police Force.  She and her partner, Curtis, investigate missing person cases, and their lives are up-ended when one of their investigations crosses paths with another that brought Scotland Yard detective Luke Holborn to Kingston.

Cast and characters 
 Tamara Lawrance as Millie-Jean Black
 Joe Dempsie as Luke Holborn
 Gershwyn Eustache Jnr as Curtis
 Chyna McQueen as Hibiscus
 Nestor Aaron Absera as Corsica
 Peter John Thwaites as Freddie Summerville 
 Hit Girl

Production 
In December 2021, it was announced that Marlon James was writing and executive producing his first television series, Get Millie Black for HBO and Channel 4, produced by Motive Pictures.  Shortly before the start of production, Tanya Hamilton was hired to direct, and starring roles were announced for Tamara Lawrance, Joe Dempsie, Gershwyn Eustache Jnr, and Chyna McQueen.

Filming began in May 2022, starting in Jamaica for about three months before moving to London.

References

External links 
 

Channel 4 original programming
HBO original programming
English-language television shows
Television series by Home Box Office
Television shows filmed in Jamaica
Upcoming television series
Works by Marlon James